Llanwnda railway station served the village of Llanwnda, Gwynedd, Wales.

History
A halt named Pwllheli Road existed here on the horse-drawn Nantlle Railway from 1856 to 12 June 1865.From the outset timetables appeared regularly in the "Carnarvon & Denbigh Herald" and in Bradshaw from October 1856. It was obliterated when the standard gauge railway and station were built.

The station opened on 2 September 1867, also as "Pwllheli Road". It was renamed "Llanwnda" in 1877 and closed with the line in December 1964.

When the Penygroes By-pass was built in 1999–2000 the site of the station was obliterated by a roundabout where the A487 and A499 meet.

References

Sources

Further material

External links
 The station site on a navigable OS Map, via National Library of Scotland
 The station and line, via Rail Map Online
 The line CNV with mileages, via Railway Codes
 Images of the station, via Yahoo
 The station, via flickr
 The station and line, via LNWR Society
 By DMU from Pwllheli to Amlwch, via Huntley Archives

Beeching closures in Wales
Disused railway stations in Gwynedd
Llanwnda, Gwynedd
Railway stations in Great Britain opened in 1867
Railway stations in Great Britain closed in 1964
Former London and North Western Railway stations